Tehran's universities in alphabetic order are:

References

Tehran, List of colleges and universities in
Universities